Sverre Nordby  (13 March 1910 – 4 December 1978) was a Norwegian football goalkeeper who played for Norway in the 1938 FIFA World Cup. He also played for Mjøndalen.

Record at FIFA Tournaments

References

External links

1910 births
1978 deaths
Norwegian footballers
Norway international footballers
Association football goalkeepers
Mjøndalen IF players
1938 FIFA World Cup players